Panther is a 1995 cinematic adaptation of Melvin Van Peebles's novel Panther, produced and directed by Mario Van Peebles. The drama film portrays the Black Panther Party for Self-Defense, tracing the organization from its founding through its decline in a compressed timeframe. It was the first narrative feature-film to depict the Black Panther Party.

Plot summary
In this semi-fictionalized account of the origins of the Black Panthers, Vietnam veteran Judge (Kadeem Hardison) returns to his hometown of Oakland to find it beset by violence and police discrimination against African-Americans. Judge's friend Cy tells him about a vigilante group that's organizing against the police and introduces him to its leaders, Bobby (Courtney B. Vance) and Huey (Marcus Chong). Judge joins the movement but is soon beset by police pressure to inform against Huey.

Cast

Reception 
On Rotten Tomatoes, the film holds a 25% approval rating based on 12 reviews. Roger Ebert stated "There is a fascinating study to be made of the Black Panther Party. Panther is not that film." Panther co-founder Bobby Seale, a major character in the film, called it "80 percent to 90 percent" untrue and "a false-light invasion of my privacy." While Kennith Turan praised it as a "sincere attempt at celebratory, spirit-raising filmmaking", he also criticized it as "a frustrating amalgam of truth, violence, supposition and inspiration".

Soundtrack

A soundtrack for the film containing R&B and hip hop music was released on May 2, 1995 by Mercury Records. It peaked at number 37 on the Billboard 200 and number 5 on the Top R&B/Hip-Hop Albums and was certified gold on July 25, 1995. Featured on the soundtrack was the single "Freedom (Theme from Panther)", a collaboration among more than 60 female R&B singers and rappers that peaked at 45 on the Billboard Hot 100.

Three singles made it to the Billboard charts, "Head Nod" by Hodge, "The Points", a collaboration between 12 of hip-hop's most popular artists and groups, and "Freedom (Theme from Panther)", a collaboration between over 60 female R&B singers and rappers.

 "Freedom (Theme from Panther)" - 4:47
Aaliyah, Felicia Adams, May May Ali, Amel Larrieux, Az-Iz, Blackgirl, Mary J. Blige, Tanya Blount, Brownstone, Casserine, Changing Faces, Coko, Tyler Collins, N'Dea Davenport, E.V.E., Emage, En Vogue, Eshe & Laurneá (of Arrested Development), Female, For Real, Penny Ford, Lalah Hathaway, Jade, Jamecia, Jazzyfatnastees, Queen Latifah, Billy Lawrence, Joi, Brigette McWilliams, Milira, Miss Jones, Cindy Mizelle, Monica, Me’Shell NdegéOcello, Natasha, Pebbles, Pure Soul, Raja-Nee, Brenda Russell, SWV, Chantay Savage, Sonja Marie, Tracie Spencer, Sweet Sable, TLC, Terri & Monica, Vybe, Crystal Waters, Caron Wheeler, Karyn White, Vanessa Williams, Xscape, Y?N-Vee, Zhané
 "Express Yourself" - 3:48 (Joe)
 "We'll Meet Again" - 4:43 (Blackstreet)
 "Black People" - 4:11 (George Clinton, Belita Woods & Funkadelic)
 "Let's Straighten It Out" - 4:05 (Usher & Monica)
 "The Points" - 4:54
 Big Mike, Biggie Smalls, Bone Thugs-n-Harmony, Buckshot, Busta Rhymes, Coolio, Digable Planets, Heltah Skeltah, Ill Al Skratch, Jamal, Menace Clan & Redman
 "Slick Partner" - 2:46 (Bobby Brown)
 "Stand (You Got To)" - 4:35 (Aaron Hall)
 "The World Is a Ghetto" - 4:32 (Da Lench Mob)
 "If I Were Your Woman" (Shanice & Female)
 "We Shall Not Be Moved" - 4:49 (Sounds of Blackness & Black Sheep)
 "A Natural Woman (You Make Me Feel Like)" - 3:48 (Female)
 "Freedom" (Dirty Dozen remix) - 4:49
 MC Lyte, Meshell Ndegeocello, Nefertiti, Patra, Queen Latifah, Salt-n-Pepa, Left Eye of TLC, Da 5 Footaz, & Yo-Yo
 "Head Nod" - 3:33 (Hodge)
 "Stand!" - 4:28 (Tony! Toni! Toné!)
 "Don't Give Me No Broccoli and Tell Me It's Green's" - 6:17 (The Last Poets)
 "The Star-Spangled Banner" - 3:12 (Brian McKnight, Boys Choir of Harlem & Slash)
 "The Ultimate Sacrifice" - 3:15 (Stanley Clarke)

Awards
 Locarno International Film Festival – Prize of the Ecumenical Jury, Special Mention: Silver Leopard

References

Bibliography

External links
 
 

1995 films
1990s biographical drama films
African-American biographical dramas
Drama films based on actual events
Films about the Black Panther Party
Black Power
Films about the Central Intelligence Agency
Cultural depictions of J. Edgar Hoover
1990s English-language films
Films about the Federal Bureau of Investigation
Films about activists
Films based on American novels
Films directed by Mario Van Peebles
Films scored by Stanley Clarke
Films set in Oakland, California
Political films based on actual events
PolyGram Filmed Entertainment films
Working Title Films films
1995 drama films
1990s American films